Franklin County is a county in the U.S. state of Nebraska. As of the 2020 census, the population was 2,889. Its county seat is Franklin. The county was formed in 1867 and organized in 1871. It was named for Benjamin Franklin.

In the Nebraska license plate system, Franklin County is represented by the prefix 50 (it had the 50th-largest number of vehicles registered in the county when the license plate system was established in 1922).

Geography
Franklin County lies on the south line of Nebraska. Its south boundary line abuts the north boundary line of the state of Kansas. The Republican River flows eastward through the southern part of Franklin County.

Major highways

  U.S. Highway 136
  Nebraska Highway 4
  Nebraska Highway 10
  Nebraska Highway 44

Adjacent counties

 Kearney County - north
 Webster County - east
 Smith County, Kansas - southeast
 Phillips County, Kansas - southwest
 Harlan County - west
 Phelps County - northwest

Demographics

As of the 2000 United States Census, there were 3,574 people, 1,485 households, and 1,021 families in the county. The population density was 6 people per square mile (2/km2). There were 1,746 housing units at an average density of 3 per square mile (1/km2). The racial makeup of the county was 99.24% White, 0.28% Native American, 0.06% Asian, 0.08% from other races, and 0.34% from two or more races. 0.64% of the population were Hispanic or Latino of any race. 63.5% were of German, 6.8% American, 6.6% English and 5.7% Irish ancestry.

There were 1,485 households, out of which 28.60% had children under the age of 18 living with them, 59.40% were married couples living together, 6.00% had a female householder with no husband present, and 31.20% were non-families. 29.20% of all households were made up of individuals, and 16.00% had someone living alone who was 65 years of age or older. The average household size was 2.34 and the average family size was 2.87.

The county population contained 24.50% under the age of 18, 4.50% from 18 to 24, 23.60% from 25 to 44, 23.50% from 45 to 64, and 23.90% who were 65 years of age or older. The median age was 43 years. For every 100 females there were 92.80 males. For every 100 females age 18 and over, there were 91.00 males.

The median income for a household in the county was $29,304, and the median income for a family was $34,958. Males had a median income of $26,192 versus $18,214 for females. The per capita income for the county was $15,390. About 9.70% of families and 13.20% of the population were below the poverty line, including 17.20% of those under age 18 and 9.40% of those age 65 or over.

Communities

City 

 Franklin

Villages 

 Bloomington
 Campbell
 Hildreth
 Naponee
 Riverton
 Upland

Unincorporated community 

 Macon

Politics
Franklin County voters have been reliably Republican for decades. In no national election since 1964 has the county selected the Democratic Party candidate (as of 2020).

See also
 National Register of Historic Places listings in Franklin County, Nebraska

References

External links

 
Nebraska counties
1871 establishments in Nebraska
Populated places established in 1871